François-Joseph de Beaupoil, marquis de Sainte-Aulaire (6 September 1643, château de Bary, Limousin – 17 December 1742, Paris) was a French poet and army officer.

Biography

External links
 Académie française

1643 births
1742 deaths
French Army officers
French poets
18th-century French writers
18th-century French male writers
French male poets